Acmaeoderella flavofasciata is a species of jewel beetles belonging to the family Buprestidae, subfamily Polycestinae.

This beetle is present in most of Europe, in the eastern Palearctic realm, and in North Africa.

Head and pronotum are wrinkled and hairy.

Main larval host plants are in genus Acer, Castanea, Fagus, Juniperus, Populus, Prunus, Pyrus, Quercus and Ulmus.

References

External links
 Biolib
 Fauna Europaea
 Host Plants of Buprestidae

Buprestidae
Beetles of Europe
Beetles described in 1763